Susan Cerulean is an American naturalist and writer. She authored a book about environmental issues facing swallow-tailed kites and wrote about environmental issues in her memoir, Coming to Pass.

Biography
She has a bachelor’s degree in biology from Eckerd College and received a masters degree in horticulture from the University of Florida. She worked for an environmental organization and then as a lobbyist for environmental group in Tallahassee before taking a position with the Florida Fish and Wildlife Conservation Commission (FFWCC). Her projects with the state agency included a Florida Wildlife Viewing Guide of top wildlife viewing sites.

WFSU's Tom Flanagan described her as "one of North Florida's most celebrated nature writers."

Her husband is oceanographer Jeff Chanton.

Selected works
I Have Been Assigned the Single Bird: A Daughter’s Memoir (2020)
Coming to Pass: Florida's Coastal Islands in a Gulf of Change University of Georgia Press (2015)
Tracking Desire: A Journey After Swallow-Tailed Kites, University of Georgia Press (2005)

References

American naturalists
21st-century American non-fiction writers
American women non-fiction writers
Eckerd College alumni
University of Florida alumni
Year of birth missing (living people)
Living people
21st-century American women writers